Gummersbach is a town in the state of North Rhine-Westphalia, Germany, being the district seat of the Oberbergischer Kreis.

History
In 1109 Gummersbach was mentioned in official documents for the first time. The document in question concerned the lowering of the episcopal tax for the church in Gummersbach by Archbishop Frederick I. At that time the name of the town was spelled as Gumeresbracht. Gummersbach received town privileges in 1857. In 1855 Gummersbach's industrial history began with the foundation of the company Steinmüller. With the company's success the little village began to grow to a town. After the company was bought in 1998 the production in Gummersbach was closed and most of the company's area was unused. Due to the fact that by the time this area made up half of the downtown area the town of Gummersbach bought this area to develop it. In the following years a multifunctional arena, shopping mall, university, movie theater, court, police station, hotel, offices and a park were built.

The coat of arms
The arms were granted on July 27, 1892. Gummersbach developed rapidly from a small village to a large town during the early 19th century, due to the metal and textile industry. The right part of the arms thus show a spindle as a symbol for the textile industry. The left part shows the arms of the Counts of the Mark, as the area belonged to the Mark since 1287.

Communities, localities and villages

Apfelbaum – Becke – Berghausen – Bernberg – Birnbaum – Börnchen – Bracht – Bredenbruch – Brink – Bruch – Brunohl – Berghausen – Deitenbach – Derschlag – Dieringhausen – Drieberhausen – Dümmlinghausen – Elbach – Erbland – Erlenhagen – Flaberg – Frömmersbach – Grünenthal – Gummeroth – Hardt – Hardt-Hanfgarten – Helberg – Herreshagen – Hesselbach – Höfen -Hömel – Hülsenbusch – Hunstig – Kalkuhl – Karlskamp – Koverstein – Lantenbach – Lieberhausen – Liefenroth – Lobscheid – Lützinghausen – Luttersiefen – Mühle – Neuenhaus – Neuenschmiede – Niedergelpe – Niedernhagen – Niederseßmar – Nochen – Oberrengse – Ohmig -Peisel – Piene – Rebbelroth – Recklinghausen – Reininghausen – Remmelsohl – Rodt – Rospe – Schneppsiefen – Schönenberg – Schusterburg – Sonnenberg – Steinenbrück – Straße – Strombach – Unnenberg – Veste – Vollmerhausen – Waldesruh – Wasserfuhr – Windhagen – Wörde – Würden

Main sights
 The Vogteihaus, former residence of the Vogt, built in 1700. It is also referred to as die Burg ("the castle"), and lies in the town center, on the Kaiserstraße.
 The Bunte Kerke ("colourful church") in the village Lieberhausen, a Protestant church with medieval wall paintings.
 The Protestant church of the village Hülsenbusch, rebuilt in the 18th century after a fire, in Baroque style.

Education
 Communal elementary schools in the towncentre and the districts Becke, Bernberg, Derschlag, Dieringhausen, Hülsenbusch, Niederseßmar, Steinenbrück and Windhagen
 Jakob Moreno school, school for learning-disabled children
 Town secondary school Gummersbach-Hepel, http://www.rs-hepel.de/
 Town secondary school  Gummersbach-Steinberg
 Town high school  – Lindengymnasium, http://www.lindengymnasium.de/
 Occupational lecture Gummersbach
 Business school Gummersbach
 Cologne University of Applied Sciences, Faculty of Computer Science and Engineering Science, https://www.th-koeln.de/informatik-und-ingenieurwissenschaften/
 Educational center for technology and economy
 Music school Gummersbach e.V.
 Town comprehensive school, http://gesamtschulegm.de
 Waldorf School Oberberg, http://fws-oberberg.de

Twin towns – sister cities

Gummersbach is twinned with:
 Afantou, Greece (2001)
 Burg, Germany (1990)
 La Roche-sur-Yon, France (1968)

Sport
The men's team VfL Gummersbach was one of the most successful handball teams of Europe in the 1970s and 1980s.

Notable people
 Heiner Brand (born 1952), former handball player and former coach of the handball national team
 Afu Thomas (Thomas Derksen), German internet celebrity in China
 , tv and radio show host
 Harald Fischer,  doctor killed in Palestine on November 15, 2000
 Wolfgang Karius,  conductor, organist, and harpsichordist
 Hella von Sinnen,  TV personality
 Jan Sosniok, movie actor
 Adele Bloesch-Stöcker, Swiss-German violinist and composer
 , former district administrator and member of the German parliament of SPD
 Jürgen Habermas (born 1929), well known philosopher

References

External links

  
 Marksteine Gummersbacher Geschichte A survey about the most important historical events 
 City of Gummersbach: Coat of Arms and Notes of the History of Gummersbach 
 Steinmüllergelände – official website of the city development project Steinmüller terrain

Towns in North Rhine-Westphalia
Oberbergischer Kreis